11-Ketoandrosterone is an endogenous steroid.

Function
11-Ketoandrosterone is an androgen. Androgens are sex hormones that stimulate or control the development and maintenance of male characteristics in vertebrates by binding to androgen receptors. However, the potency of 11-ketoandrosterone as an agonist of androgen receptors is not known as of 2020.

Structure
11-Ketoandrosterone is a 11-keto form of androsterone.

11-Ketoandrosterone belongs to a group of 11-oxyandrogens, i.e. 11-oxygenated (oxygen atom on C11 position forms a ketone group) 19-carbon steroids. 11-oxyandrogens are potent and clinically relevant agonists of the androgen receptors. Potency of 11-ketotestosterone, an 11-oxyandrogen, is similar to that of testosterone. 11-ketotestosterone, derived from 11β-hydroxyandrostenedione, may serve as the main androgen for healthy women.

Clinical relevance
11-Ketoandrosterone is a metabolite that may be biosynthesized within the androgen backdoor pathway, a metabolic pathway for androgen synthesis that bypasses testosterone as an intermediate product.

SRD5A2 catalyzes the 5α-reduction of 11-ketotestosterone that terminates at 11-ketoandrosterone, but only causes a small amount of 11-ketotestosterone inactivation. However, since the metabolism of the glucocorticoid cortisol also produces 11-ketocholosterone, 11-ketoandrosterone may be considered as a more specific urinary marker for the production of 11-ketotestosterone.

See also
 Androgen backdoor pathway
 Androsterone

References

Secondary alcohols
Androgens and anabolic steroids
Hormones of the suprarenal cortex
Ketones